{{DISPLAYTITLE:C31H52N2O23}}
The molecular formula C31H52N2O23 (molar mass: 820.74 g/mol) may refer to:

 Sialyl-LewisA
 Sialyl-LewisX

Molecular formulas